The 2010 Vuelta al Táchira began on January 13 and ended on January 24. This was the 45th edition of the Vuelta al Táchira.

Stages

Final classification

References

Stage 1 Results
Stage 2 Results
Stage 3 Results
Stage 4 Results
Stage 5 Results
Stage 6 Results
Stage 7 Results
Stage 8 Results
Stage 9 Results
Stage 10 Results
Stage 11 Results
Stage 12 Results

Vuelta al Táchira
Venezuela
Tachira